M. Rashiduzzaman Millat is a Bangladesh Nationalist Party politician and the former Member of Parliament of Jamalpur-1.

Career
Millat was elected to parliament from Jamalpur-1 as a Bangladesh Nationalist Party candidate in 2001.

In 2007, Millat was sentenced to six years imprisonment for tax dodging. Bangladesh Supreme Court barred him from contesting the 2018 elections due to his conviction.

References

Bangladesh Nationalist Party politicians
Living people
8th Jatiya Sangsad members
People from Jamalpur District
Year of birth missing (living people)